Fagocyba is a genus of true bugs belonging to the family Cicadellidae.

The species of this genus are found in Europe and Northern America.

Species:
 Fagocyba alnisuga Arzone, 1976 
 Fagocyba carri (Edwards, 1914)

References

Cicadellidae
Hemiptera genera